Mauro Picenardi (1735 in Crema, Lombardy – May 30, 1809 in Bergamo) was an Italian painter.

Biography
He was the son of the Cremonese painter Tommaso Picenardi, He also trained with Gianbettino Cignaroli in the latter's academy in Verona. In 1776, he painted three altarpieces for the Duomo of Cremona, depicting St Lucy, The Visitation and San Pantaleone. Ticozzi thought he was related to the family of Carlo Picenardi, a 17th-century painter.

Mauro Picenardi's oil-on-canvas picture Venus and Juno sold for $74,000 in a 1997 auction in New York City.

References

1735 births
1809 deaths
18th-century Italian painters
Italian male painters
19th-century Italian painters
Painters from Bergamo
Painters from Verona
19th-century Italian male artists
18th-century Italian male artists